The HTC Desire 626s is an Android-powered smartphone manufactured by HTC.  It is available on Cricket (a subsidiary of AT&T), T-Mobile, MetroPCS (a T-Mobile subsidiary), Sprint Prepaid, and Virgin Mobile (a Sprint subsidiary) in the United States.  The phone was announced in July 2015.  It is considered the "budget" version of the Desire 626.

Features
The phone has a 5-inch screen with 720p resolution.  The rear camera is capable of 8-megapixel photos and 720p HD video (30 frames per second), while the front-facing camera has a 2 MP resolution.  It uses a microUSB charger and Bluetooth 4.1.  The phone is shipped with Android 5.1 "Lollipop" but can be upgraded to Android 6.0 "Marshmallow".

References

Desire 626s
Discontinued smartphones